The Botanical Society of Scotland (BSS) is the national learned society for botanists of Scotland. The Society's aims are to advance knowledge and appreciation  of flowering and cryptogamic plants, algae and fungi. The Society's activities include lectures (mainly held in Edinburgh, but also in other Scottish cities), symposia, field excursions, field projects and an annual Scottish Botanist's Conference, held jointly with the Botanical Society of Britain and Ireland for exchange of information between botanists working in different areas. Its publications include a twice-yearly newsletter, BSS News, and a scientific journal, Plant Ecology & Diversity. The society is closely linked to the Royal Botanic Garden Edinburgh and the Scottish universities.

History
It was founded on 8 February 1836 as the Botanical Society of Edinburgh. Its founding members included Prof Edward Forbes, Prof John Hutton Balfour and Dr Richard Parnell.

In 1935 the Botanical Society of Edinburgh incorporated the Cryptogamic Society of Scotland, founded in 1875, and included its name in its title. Its name changed again in 1991 to Botanical Society of Scotland, incorporating the Cryptogamic Society of Scotland. The Botanical Society of Scotland has been a charity registered in Scotland since 19 February 1918, and became a Scottish Charitable Incorporated Organisation (SCIO) (No. SC016283) on 15 April 2014.

Activities 

BSS is the only British botanical society with a keen interest in both flowering and non-flowering plants (e.g. ferns, mosses and algae) and fungi. This wide range of interest is reflected in its programme of monthly lectures during winter months, held mainly at the Royal Botanic Garden Edinburgh. Field  meetings are held during summer and autumn to record both flowering and non-flowering plants all over Scotland. BSS also runs courses in special topics such as grass identification. An annual meeting, the Scottish Botanist's Conference is held each autumn, run jointly by BSBI, BSS and the Royal Botanic Garden Edinburgh.  Symposia and conferences devoted to specific topics such as Plant Phenology are organised from time to time.

Publications

The Botanical Society of Edinburgh published its first journal, Transactions of the Botanical Society of Edinburgh, from 1844 to 1990. In 1991, this was replaced with Botanical Journal of Scotland, published by Edinburgh University Press, to reflect the change of the society's name to "Botanical Society of Scotland" in the same year. In 2008, to give the journal an international appeal, Botanical Journal of Scotland was in turn replaced by Plant Ecology and Diversity, published by Taylor & Francis. Plant Ecology and Diversity was accepted for inclusion in Scopus in 2010 and it received its first impact factor, 2.053, in 2011.

Presidents
Source (1836-1937):
Botanical Society of Edinburgh

Botanical Society of Scotland (1990-)
1990-1992 : Dr James H. Dickson
1992-1994 : Miss J. Muscott
1994-1996 : Dr Kwiton Jong
1996–1998 : Prof. John Proctor 
1998-2000 : Prof. Elizabeth Cutter
2000-2002 : Dr George Argent
2002-2004 : Mr Philip Lusby
2004-2006 : Dr Douglas Malcolm
2006-2008 : Prof. Richard Abbott
2008-2010 : Dr Christopher Jeffree
2010-2012 : Dr Barbara Sumner
2012-2017 : Prof. John Grace 
2017-2019 : Dr Brian Ballinger 
2019-2021 : Dr Julia Wilson
2021–present : Dr Jill Thompson

Other notable members
 Albert, Prince Consort
 Queen Victoria, the society's first patron
 Alexander Adie
 Alexander von Humboldt
 Cardale Babington
 William Brand, founder member
 Robert Brown
 Alexander Bryson
 William Carruthers
 Thomas Frederic Cheeseman
 Charles Darwin, author of On The Origin of Species
 Job Bicknell Ellis
 Godfrey Howitt
 Edward Janczewski
 Paul Gordon Jarvis FRS, plant ecologist, Professor of Forestry and Natural Resources at the University of Edinburgh 
 George Lawson, the "father of Canadian botany", was assistant secretary and curator of the society
 Lars Levi Læstadius
 Duncan Napier
 Robert Thomson, pioneer of sanitation
 Göte Turesson
 Charles Wyville Thomson, chief scientist on the Challenger Expedition
 Katherine Sophia Kane, the first elected female member of the society
 Prince Philip, Duke of Edinburgh, Honorary Fellow

See also
 Flora of Scotland
 Royal Caledonian Horticultural Society
 Scottish Natural Heritage

References

External links

 Facebook group

 Botanical Scientific Journals

1836 establishments in Scotland
1836 in science
 
Scotland
British biology societies
Charities based in Edinburgh
Flora of Scotland
Learned societies of Scotland
Royal Botanic Garden Edinburgh
Organizations established in 1836